Richard Ryder (August 20, 1942 – October 27, 1995) was an American actor from Rochester, New York.

Career 
Ryder starred in the film Abuse and appeared in Forever Young, as well as the television movies Threesome, Laker Girls, Cries Unheard: The Donna Yaklich Story and When the Dark Man Calls.

He also played a Bajoran deputy in the Star Trek: Deep Space Nine episodes "Past Prologue" and "Babel" and also guest starred in Dream On, Designing Women and Party of Five.

With a live performance career that spanned thirty years, Richard appeared in Las Vegas at the Lido de Paris, sang with Juliette Prowse and was Marty Allen’s stage partner.  Theater credits are many regional, off-Broadway, Broadway, and the national tour of They're Playing Our Song alongside Dawn Wells of Gilligan's Island fame and Lorna Luft.

Personal life 
Ryder died in Hollywood, California in 1995, of AIDS, aged 53.

Filmography

Film

Television

External links
 
Richard Ryder on IBDb

References 

1942 births
1995 deaths
Male actors from Rochester, New York
American male film actors
American male television actors
AIDS-related deaths in California
20th-century American male actors